The Bartow County School District  is a public school district in Bartow County, Georgia, United States, based in Cartersville. It serves the communities of Adairsville, Atco, Cartersville, Cassville, Emerson, Euharlee, Kingston, Rowland Springs, Stilesboro, Taylorsville, and White.
Within the city limits of Cartersville, students are served by Cartersville City School District.

Schools
The Bartow County School District holds twelve elementary schools, four middle schools, and three high schools.

Elementary schools
Adairsville Elementary School
Allatoona Elementary School
Clear Creek Elementary School
Cloverleaf Elementary School
Emerson Elementary School
Euharlee Elementary School
Hamilton Crossing Elementary School
Kingston Elementary School
Mission Road Elementary School
Pine Log Elementary School
Taylorsville Elementary School
White Elementary School

Middle schools
Adairsville Middle School
Cass Middle School
Red Top Middle School 
Woodland Middle School

High schools
Adairsville High School
Cass High School
Woodland High School

College And Career Academy
Bartow College And Career Academy

References

External links

School districts in Georgia (U.S. state)
Education in Bartow County, Georgia